Agilberta (d. 680), also known as Aguilberta of Jouarre and Gilberta of Jouarre, is a Benedictine French saint, venerated in both the Roman Catholic Church and Antiochian Orthodox Church.  She was a nun and the second abbess of the Jouarre Abbey, in the département of Seine-et-Marne.  Agilberta was a relative of Ebrigisil and Ado, who founded Jouarre in 660.  Her brother, Agilbert, was bishop of Paris.  Agilberta's sister, Balda, was Jouarre's third abbess.

Agilberta's feast day is August 10.  She died in 680. She is buried in the crypt at Jouarre in one of three well-preserved sarcophagi. It is of particular interest to scholars because of its stonework following the Roman burial tradition.

References

External links
Benedictine Abbey Notre Dame de Jouarre (in French)

680 deaths
7th-century Christian saints
French women by century
7th-century Frankish people